Glewo  (German Klewerhof) is a settlement in the administrative district of Gmina Grzmiąca, within Szczecinek County, West Pomeranian Voivodeship, in north-western Poland.

See also
History of Pomerania

References

Glewo